The Songs for Heroes is a benefit concert dedicated for the immediate families of soldiers and policemen in the Philippines. It is initiated by the television channel, UNTV, and the Members Church of God International with its leaders Bro. Eli Soriano, Bro. Daniel Razon with special participation of Philippine National Police, Tagaligtas and Armed Forces of the Philippines. It is directed by Floy Quintos with Mon del Rosario as its musical director and Alex Cortez serve as creative director.

Songs For Heroes 1
It is the first benefit concert dedicated to the families of SAF 44 who were casualties at the Mamasapano clash held at the SM Mall of Asia Arena, Pasay on 19 March 2015. The March concert raised six million pesos.

Participants

 Noel Cabangon
 Jonalyn Viray
 Gerald Santos
 Faith Cuneta
 Bo Cerrudo
 Neocolours
 Jay Durias
 Mcoy Fundales
 Miro Valera
 Jason Fernandez
 Jek Manuel
 Beverly Caimen
 Shanne Velasco
 The Voysing
 Bueno Sisters
 Bembe and Triposa Erese
 Arnee Hidalgo

Other Performances
 AFP and PNP Talents
 AFP Combo
 PNP Chorale
 Ang Dating Daan Choir

Songs For Heroes 2

With its theme: Ang Mamatay Nang Dahil Sa Iyo (To Die For You), Songs For Heroes 2 was held on 30 June 2015 also at the SM Mall of Asia Arena. Ticket proceeds of the said concert were given to the AFP and PNP for the fallen and wounded soldiers in line for duty. Several government officials including DOJ Sec. Leila de Lima, Court Administrator Midas Marquez, AFP Chief of Staff Pio Catapang and PNP Chief of Staff Leonardo Espina went there in the concert. PBC President Atom Henares and PBC Chairman Emeritus Larry Henares personally joined the crowd.

Participants

 Gerphil Flores
 Gwyneth Dorado
 Jed Madela
 Jenine Desiderio
 Sam Shoaf
 Kuh Ledesma
 Wency Cornejo
 Jeffrey Hidalgo

Other Performances
 The 5th Gen
 PNP and AFP Chorale

Songs For Heroes 3

Recognizing the sacrifices of soldiers and police personnel in Marawi City and to give charity benefits of their immediate families, UNTV hosted Songs For Heroes 3, with the theme Bayani ng Marawi (Heroes of Marawi). A benefit concert aimed to support families of those killed in action (KIA) during the 154-day siege. The concert was held at SM Mall of Asia Area on 31 October 2017. The concert gave financial assistance of 6 million pesos to the Armed Forces of the Philippines (AFP) and two million pesos to the Philippine National Police (PNP).

Participants

 Kris Lawrence
 Darren Espanto
 Jason Dy
 Richard Reynoso
 Jamie Rivera
 Jett Pangan
 Chacha Cañete
 Bo Cerrudo
 Aia De Leon
 Ney Dimaculagan
 Leah Patricio
 Plethora
 Mela

Other Performances
 The KNC Kids
 Wish 107.5's Wishcovery's Wishful 20
 PNP and AFP Chorale

References

Members Church of God International
Concerts
2015 concert tours
2015 in the Philippines